The following is a timeline of the history of the city of Jeddah, Kingdom of Saudi Arabia.

Prior to 20th century

 500 BCE - Quda'a settle.
 647 CE -  Uthman Ibn Affan, turns Jeddah into a port making it the port of Makkah instead of Al Shoaiba port.
 703 CE - Jeddah was briefly occupied by pirates from the Kingdom of Axum.
 969 CE - Fatimids in power.
 1177 - Jeddah becomes part of the Ayyubid Empire.
 1254 - City becomes part of the Mamluk Sultanate.
 1400 - In the 15th century it became the centre of trade between Egypt and India.
 1517 - City besieged by Ottomans.
 1525 - Barracks built; city walls rebuilt with six watchtowers and six city gates.
 1541 - City besieged by Portuguese.
 1804 - Town besieged by Sauds.
 1811 - Ottomans in power.
 1813 - Battle of Jeddah (1813).
 1814 - Population: 15,000 (approximate).
 1820 - European cemetery established (approximate date).
 1858 - 15 June: "Massacre."
 1881 - Nasseef House built.

20th century

 1910 - Population: 20,000 (approximate).
 1916 - Sharifians in power.
 1924 - Capital of Kingdom of Hejaz relocates to Jeddah from Mecca.
 1925 - Battle of Jeddah (1925), House of Saud in power.
 1927 - Ittihad Football Club formed.
 1932 - Khozam Palace built.
 1937
 Al Madina (newspaper) begins publication.
 Al-Ahli Saudi Sports Club formed.
 1938 - Al-Ahli Jeddah (basketball) club formed.
 1946 - Jeddah Chamber of Commerce & Industry established.
 1947 - City wall dismantled.
 1953 - National Commercial Bank headquartered in Jeddah.
 1960 - Okaz newspaper begins publication.
 1962 - Population: 147,859.
 1967 - King Abdulaziz University established.
 1970 - Prince Abdullah al-Faisal Stadium opens.
 1971 - Organization of the Islamic Conference headquartered in city.
 1972 - International Islamic News Agency headquartered in Jeddah.
 1974 - Population: 561,104.
 1975
 Islamic Development Bank headquartered in Jeddah.
 Hajj Research Centre founded at King Abdul Aziz University.
 Arab News begins publication.
 1976 - Saudi Gazette begins publication.
 1977 - British International School established.
 1981 - King Abdulaziz International Airport begins operating.
 1983 - Corniche Road constructed.
 1984 - Dallah Al-Baraka in business.
 1985 - King Fahd's Fountain begins operating.
 1987
 Jufali Mosque, King Saud Mosque, and Al-Mahmal Center built.
 King Abdul Aziz Public Library and Prince Sultan bin Fahd Stadium open.
 Population: 1,312,000.
 1988 - Azizeyah Mosque, Binladen Mosque, and Suleiman Mosque built.
 1990
 Jeddah Light (lighthouse) constructed.
 Jeddah Historical Preservation Society organized.
 1993 - Arab Radio and Television Network established.
 1998
 Iqraa TV headquartered in Jeddah.
 Al-Ittihad Jeddah (basketball) club formed.
 1999
 Jeddah Economic Forum begins.
 Saudi Geological Survey headquartered in Jeddah.

21st century

 2003 - Jeddah United women's basketball team formed.
 2005
 Adel Fakeih becomes mayor.
 Population: 2,800,000 (estimate).
 Serafi Mega Mall in business.
 2006
 Jeddah Film Festival begins.
 Jeddah TV Tower built.
 2008 - Mall of Arabia and Red Sea Mall in business.
 2009 - 25 November: Flood.
 2010
 Hani Mohammad Aburas becomes mayor.
 Population: 3,430,697.
 2011
 26 January: Flood.
 King Road Tower built.
 Women to drive demonstrations.
 2012 - Population: 5,112,018.
 2014 - Air pollution in Jeddah reaches annual mean of 68 PM2.5 and 161 PM10, much higher than recommended.

See also
 List of universities and colleges in Jeddah
 Timelines of other cities in Saudi Arabia: Mecca, Medina, Riyadh

References

Bibliography

Published in 18th-19th centuries
 
 
 
 
 
 

Published in 20th century
 
 A. Pesce. Jiddah: Portrait of an Arabian City. London, 1974.
 
 
  
 

Published in 21st century

External links

 
 

Years in Saudi Arabia
 Timeline
Jeddah